Nurstead (or Nursted) is a locality, ecclesiastical parish and former civil parish situated 3 miles south of  Gravesend and ½ a mile north of Meopham, Kent, England.

The parish was in the  Hundred of Toltingtrough in the Lathe of Aylesford in the county of Kent. It has an area of 522 acres.

The name of the parish was "Notestede" in the Domesday Book, but by the 18th century although formally spelled "Nutsted" it was at this time commonly called Nursted.

 
Nurstead has a small 14th-century church, dedicated to Saint Mildred and this is still the church of the parish, although the benefice is united with Meopham.  St Mildred's church is a listed building with walls of oblong flints.

A quarter of a mile north of the church is Nurstead Court, one of the most famous small medieval houses in the country.

The civil parish was abolished in 1935 when it was united with Cobham and in 1963 it was transferred to Meopham. A minor exception was Zimmermans a private bungalow built between 1928 and 1930 on 3/4 acre of land purchased from Nurstead Court Estate.  This land was next to the border with Cobham and was not transferred into Meopham in 1963, as indicated in 2000 when a boundary marker was erected on White Post Lane. The Sallows Shaw area south of that road also remained in Cobham.

Nurstead is a small parish, being not quite a mile in extent each way. It lies most of it on high ground, and has a great variety of soils, having in it arable, orchard, and hop ground, and some woodland towards the north boundary of it, next to Northfleet (formerly a parish and then an Urban District; it joins to Meopham southward. In 1797 there were but five houses in it, i.e.. Nurstead Court, Nurstead Hill Farm at the west end of the parish, and Copthall, at the east end, plus two cottages. Nurstead has a thriving village team in the grounds on Nurstead Court.

In the following century  and up until the abolition of the civil parish, the population remained low, as follows:

Notable people
James Edmeades (1843–1917), cricketer and British Army officer

Notes

Gravesham
Villages in Kent